Sawgoek ("root script",) or sawva ("insect script") was a mythological ancient script mentioned in the Zhuang creation epic Baeu Rodo (modern Zhuang script: Baeuqroekdoz). The primordial god Baeu Ro was said to have brought sawgoek containing four thousand glyphs along with fire to the Zhuang people. However, in their unfamiliarity with fire, the people stored the fire under a thatched roof, causing the house to catch on fire. The sawgoek was consumed in the ensuing conflagration, and knowledge of writing was lost. Some Zhuang scholars believe that this myth stems from a vague remembrance of sawgoek in the collective consciousness of the Zhuang people long after knowledge of the writing system had been forgotten.

Sawveh ("etched script") refers to some 140 individual symbols inscribed on stonework, pottery, and bronzeworks excavated in western Guangxi, dating from the late Neolithic to the Bronze Age, the earliest examples being contemporary with the Shang Dynasty in the North China Plain. The glyphs bear some semblance to the glyphs of the Hemudu culture, Wucheng culture, Maqiao ruins (stratum V), Taihu Late Neolithic, and other Old Yue ruins in Guangdong. Some scholars suggest that these inscriptions are characteristic of an undeciphered logographic writing system or proto-writing, but this is disputed due to the lack of evidence of complete phrases.

As Chinese cultural influence spread through the Lingnan region from the Qin Dynasty onwards, the Chinese script came to dominate the region. From the Tang and Song Dynasties onwards, a script for the Zhuang languages based on Chinese characters called sawndip ("raw script") came into use.

References

External links 

 "Firemaking" section of the Baeu Rodo (in modern Zhuang script)

Proto-writing